Major-General Sir John Duncan  (24 February 1872 – 17 September 1948) was a British Army officer who commanded the Shanghai Defence Force.

Military career
Duncan was educated at the Royal Military College, and joined the Royal Scots Fusiliers in 1891. He served on the North West Frontier of the British Raj, 1897-8 before taking part in the Second Boer War (1899–1901). On 31 January 1902 he was seconded for service on the Staff, and appointed brigade major of the infantry brigade at Malta.

He served in World War I at Gallipoli before being appointed commander of 78th Infantry Brigade in 1916 and then general officer commanding 22nd Division in Macedonia in 1917. After the war he became major-general on the General Staff of the Army of the Black Sea from April to December 1919.  He was appointed military attaché in Rome in 1920, general officer commanding 54th (East Anglian) Infantry Division in 1923 and major-general commanding the Shanghai Military Force in China in 1927-8. The Shanghai Defence Force was established in January 1927 amidst concerns that British lives and properties were at risk during the unrest in China at the time. In practice he had to deal with a diplomatic incident when a British military plane made a forced landing on the International Race Course in Jiangwan. His last appointment was as general officer commanding 1st Division at Aldershot early in 1928 before retiring later that year and receiving a knighthood.

Duncan was Chief Commissioner of the St John Ambulance Brigade from 1931 to 1943. He was appointed a Bailiff Grand Cross (the highest grade) of the Venerable Order of St John in 1946.

References

|-

|-

1872 births
1948 deaths
British Army major generals
Royal Scots Fusiliers officers
Knights Commander of the Order of the Bath
Companions of the Order of St Michael and St George
Commanders of the Royal Victorian Order
Companions of the Distinguished Service Order
Bailiffs Grand Cross of the Order of St John
British Army generals of World War I
British military attachés
British Army personnel of the Second Boer War
Graduates of the Royal Military College, Sandhurst